Am Dafok is a village in the Vakaga prefecture of Central African Republic (CAR). The town sits on the CAR side of the border with Sudan; on the Sudanese side of the border is the state of South Darfur. According to the 2003 census Am Dafok has a population of 2,915.

History 
Following the independence of South Sudan in 2011, the road that passes through Am Dafok became the only remaining CAR–Sudan border crossing.

On 14 October 2019 Am Dafok was captured by Movement of Central African Liberators for Justice (MLCJ).  On 16 December it was recaptured by the Popular Front for the Rebirth of Central African Republic (FPRC). On 12 May 2021 armed forces which were deployed before withdrew from Am Dafok after attacks by Messiria Arabs.

Conflict 
In Vakaga Prefecture, cross-border tensions persisted. Armed Misseriya elements continued illegal taxation in Am Dafok, including on 3 February, when a humanitarian convoy was attacked. Misseriya's growing control was revealed by a MINUSCA field mission. Close to the Sudanese border On April 16, armed Misseriya elements attacked a national security facility. Defense forces patrol in Am-Sissia, killing three people and injuring four others. On May 12, soldiers from the national defense forces stationed in Am Dafok left for Birao. As a result of persistent threats from armed elements In the middle of the night, their convoy was ambushed. Two people were injured in the early evening by presumed armed Misseriya elements near Dongore.

Geography 
The small settlement is located within the border of the African Grassland and the Sahara Desert and is in a Sub-Tropic zone of the continent.

References 

Populated places in Vakaga
Central African Republic–Sudan border crossings